Philip George Burke FRS (18 October 1932—4 June 2019) was a British theoretical and computational physicist who developed the R-matrix method for studying electron collisions with atoms and molecules.

Life 
He was born in London. He graduated from  University College of the South West, and University College London. He worked at the National Physical Laboratory, Teddington. From 1959 to 1960, he worked at the Lawrence Berkeley Radiation Laboratory.

The majority of Burke's research career was based at Queen's University Belfast, where he was a member of the Centre for Theoretical Atomic, Molecular and Optical Physics.

He was elected Fellow of the Royal Society in 1978 and was awarded a CBE in 1993.

References 

British physicists
Computational physicists
Theoretical physicists
Fellows of the Royal Society
Academics of Queen's University Belfast
1932 births
2019 deaths
Members of the Order of the British Empire